Trishal is an upazila of Mymensingh District in the Division of Mymensingh, Bangladesh. The famous Bengali poet Kazi Nazrul Islam attended a school here.

Demographics
According to the 2011 Bangladesh census, Trishal had a population of 419,308. Males constituted 49.76% of the population and females 50.24%. Muslims formed 97.23% of the population, Hindus 2.70%, Christians 0.02% and others 0.05%. Trishal had a literacy rate of 40.02% for the population 7 years and above.

Administration
Trishal Thana was formed in 1909 and it was turned into an upazila in 1983.

Trishal Upazila is divided into Trishal Municipality and 12 union parishads: Amirabari, Bailar, Baliparar, Dhanikhola, Harirampur, Kanihari, Kanthal, Mathbari, Mukshapur, Rampura, Sakhua, and Trishal. The union parishads are subdivided into 91 mauzas and 158 villages.

Trishal Municipality is subdivided into 9 wards and 12 mahallas.

Unions and villages
The following 12 Unions' list (Alphabetical Arranged) is given below:
Trishal Union- Area 2827 hectares Name of Villages : Aultia Golaghita, Bagan, Chikna Monohar, Konabari, Naodhar, Panch Para, Satra Para, Salimpur, Trishal
Amirabari Union- Area 2068 hectares  Name of Villages : Amirabari, Baragaon (1st. Portion), Baragaon (2nd. Portion), Gopalpur, Guziam, Narayanpur and Amira bari (Namapara)
Bailar Union- Area 2548 hectares Name of Villages : Bailar, Dewaniabari, Dulalbari, Hadderbhita, Kanhar, Kazir Simla, Pardhanikhola, Rudragram
Baliparar Union- Area 3113 hectares Name of Villages : Amian Dangari, Bahadurpur, Bali Para, Beara, Char Madakhali, Char Madakhali Purbai, Dhala, Ichhamati, Kalsiddha, Kazigram, Patuli
Dhanikhola Union- Area 3140 hectares Name of Villages : Dhanikhola,Sonakhali, Pajlarchar, Madhya Bhatipara, Uzan bhatipara, Charkumaria, Dakkhin Bhatipara, Samania Para, Bhawaliapara, Goysapara, jhiarpar, Palashtoli, Chopagaria, Moishateki, Katakhali. 
Harirampur Union- Area 2380 hectares Name of Village : Nighor kanda, Chauladi, Golabhita, Harirampur, Magurjora, Rayer gram & South Kanda.
Kanihari Union- Area 3120 hectares  Name of Villages :Baraigaon, Bahalikanda, Polashtoly, Baghadaria, Baghadaria Dak, Balidia, Barma, Bearta, Chandbari, Deopara, Gobindapur, Garpara, Jilki, Kanihari, Kushtia (1), Kushtia(2), Mandatia, Raghab Bari, Sultanpur, Thapanhala, Tirkhi. 
Kanthal Union- Area 2364 hectares Name of Villages : Baniadhala, Banpathalia, Dhala Amian, Jasiddhar, Kanthal, Muhuriabari, Nalchira, Rajabari, Bangram, Singrail. 
Mathbari Union- Area 3766 hectares Name of Villages : Alahari, Badamia, Kuragacha, Khagati Para, Horiyagoni, Mathabari. 
Mukshapur Union- Area 2836 hectares  Name of Villages : Kaitarbari, Konabakhail, Lalpur, Mukshapur, Nijbakhail, Phuti, Shankibhanga, Sapkhali, Senerchak, Jamtoli. 
Rampura Union- Area 2827 hectares Name of Villages : Darila, Kakchar, Rampura. 
Sakhua Union- Area 1752 hectares  Name of Villages : Akhrail, Babupura, Bishnupur, Gandakhola, Nagarchhara, Naopara, Sakhua.

Education

University
Jatiya Kabi Kazi Nazrul Islam University, established on 1 March 2005. Its first batch class was started in June 2007.

Colleges
 Government Nazrul College
 Trishal Women's Degree College
 Trishal Women's Technical & B.M. College
 Islami Academy School & College
 Trishal Technical and B.M. College
 Aulianagar College
 Kalir Bazar School & College
 Danikhola Technical & Commercial College
 Mukshapur College
 Trishal International School & College
 Trishal Ideal School & College
 Kanthal High School & College
 Hazi Cherag Ali Degree College, Dhanikhola
 Central Technical & Business Management College, Trishal.

Gallery

Notable residents
 Abul Mansur Ahmed, journalist, politician and littérateur, was born at Dhanikhola in 1898.
 Abul Kalam Shamsuddin, journalist and littérateur, was born at Trishal in 1897.

References

Upazilas of Mymensingh District